Pearce Ferry (sometimes misspelled Pierce Ferry) marks the boundary between Lake Mead and the Grand Canyon, where the low sandy banks around the lake give way to imposing, colorfully layered cliffs that enclose the Colorado River for the next 277 miles upstream. Lake Mead, and all of its points of interest, is managed by the National Park Service and available to the public for recreational purposes.  A ferry was operated here by the Pearce family starting around 1876.

Location
The ferry is located at the end of the 52 mile Dolan Spring road, starting from US Route 93 half way between the Hoover Dam and Kingman.
This road is also the access to Meadview, Arizona.

Fish species
 Largemouth bass
 Striped bass
 Crappie
 Sunfish
 Channel catfish
 Carp

References

External links
 Pearce Ferry information
 Arizona Boating Locations Facilities Map
 Arizona Fishing Locations Map

Lake Mead
Protected areas of Mohave County, Arizona